O-Ethyl methylphosphonothioic acid (EMPTA) is an organophosphate compound. A dual-use chemical, it has constructive uses in the synthesis of pesticides and pharmaceuticals, and it is also a precursor in the synthesis of nerve agents such as Agent VM and Agent VX. The detection of EMPTA is cited as a major influence in the United States' 1998 decision to destroy the Al-Shifa pharmaceutical factory in Sudan.

References

Phosphonothioates